Gandhinagar Thermal Power Station is a coal-fired power station in Gujarat, India.  It is located on the bank of Sabarmati river near Gandhinagar.

See also 

 Ukai Thermal Power Station
 Wanakbori Thermal Power Station
 Sikka Thermal Power Station
 Dhuvaran Thermal Power Station
 Kutch Thermal Power Station

References 

Coal-fired power stations in Gujarat
1977 establishments in Gujarat
Energy infrastructure completed in 1977
20th-century architecture in India